Clarence Dean Derby (June 11, 1935 – October 29, 2021) was an American football defensive back in the National Football League. He played six seasons for the Pittsburgh Steelers (1957–1961) and the Minnesota Vikings (1961–1962).

He died on October 29, 2021, in Walla Walla, Washington at age 86.

References

1935 births
2021 deaths
People from Leavenworth, Washington
Players of American football from Washington (state)
American football cornerbacks
Washington Huskies football players
Pittsburgh Steelers players
Minnesota Vikings players
Eastern Conference Pro Bowl players